Actinochloris is a genus of green algae, in the family Actinochloridaceae, with a single species Actinochloris sphaerica.

References

External links

Chlamydomonadales genera
Chlamydomonadales
Monotypic algae genera